Chen Quanjiang (born 10 July 2000) is a Chinese footballer currently playing as a defender for Guangzhou.

Career statistics

Club
.

References

2000 births
Living people
Chinese footballers
Association football defenders
China League One players
Chinese Super League players
Guangzhou F.C. players
Inner Mongolia Zhongyou F.C. players